Blue City may refer to:

 Blue City (film), a 1986 film adaptation of the novel Blue City starring Judd Nelson and Ally Sheedy
 Blue City (manga), a science fiction graphic novel by Yukinobu Hoshino
 Blue City (novel), a 1947 detective novel by Ross Macdonald
 Blue City, Oman, a city in Oman
 BlueCity, Rotterdam, Netherlands
 Jodhpur, India, nicknamed Blue City
 Reni, Alwar, India, nicknamed Blue City
 Chefchaouen, Morocco, nicknamed the Blue City
 A U.S. city whose municipal government is controlled by the U.S. Democratic Party
 A city in the U.S. with stringent restrictions on the sale and consumption of alcohol

See also
 Hohhot, Inner Mongolia, China, whose name means "Blue City"